Cognatic kinship is a mode of descent calculated from an ancestor counted through any combination of male and female links, or a system of bilateral kinship where relations are traced through both a father and mother. Such relatives may be known as cognates.

See also
 Matrilineality
 Patrilineality
 Hapū

References

Kinship and descent
Descendants of individuals